Daniel Wright Wagoner (December 12, 1959 – ) was an American football defensive back. He played for the Detroit Lions from 1982 to 1984, the Minnesota Vikings in 1984, and the Atlanta Falcons in 1985. He played college football at Kansas.

References

1959 births
1997 deaths
American football defensive backs
Kansas Jayhawks football players
Detroit Lions players
Minnesota Vikings players
Atlanta Falcons players